Francis Columbine (died 22 September 1746) was a British Army officer and Governor of Gibraltar.

Life
Columbine served in the wars of Queen Anne under John Churchill, 1st Duke of Marlborough, and was for many years an officer of the 8th Regiment of Foot, in which corps he rose to the rank of major. He was subsequently promoted to the lieutenant-colonelcy of the 10th Regiment of Foot and performed the duty of commanding officer of the 10th upwards of twelve years, keeping the regiment in a high state of discipline and efficiency. He was promoted to the rank of major-general on 29 October 1735, and was rewarded with the colonelcy of his own regiment (later the 10th Foot) on 27 January 1737. On 2 July 1739 he was advanced to the rank of lieutenant-general.

He was Governor of Gibraltar for six months between October 1739 and April 1740. Cathedral Square in Gibraltar is on the site of what was Columbine Street.

Notes

References
 Richard Cannon, Historical Record of the Tenth, or the North Lincolnshire Regiment of Foot (1847) page 77.

|-

1746 deaths
British Army lieutenant generals
King's Regiment (Liverpool) officers
Royal Lincolnshire Regiment officers
British military personnel of the War of the Spanish Succession
Year of birth unknown
Governors of Gibraltar
Freemasons of the Premier Grand Lodge of England